Tricorynus bifoveatus is a species in the family Ptinidae ("death-watch and spider beetles"), in the order Coleoptera ("beetles").
It is found in North America.

References

Further reading
 Arnett, R.H. Jr., M. C. Thomas, P. E. Skelley and J. H. Frank. (eds.). (2002). American Beetles, Volume II: Polyphaga: Scarabaeoidea through Curculionoidea. CRC Press LLC, Boca Raton, FL.
 Richard E. White. (1983). Peterson Field Guides: Beetles. Houghton Mifflin Company.
 Ross H. Arnett. (2000). American Insects: A Handbook of the Insects of America North of Mexico. CRC Press.
 White, Richard E. (1965). "A Revision of the Genus Tricorynus of North America (Coleoptera: Anobiidae)". Miscellaneous Publications of the Entomological Society of America, vol. 4, no. 7, 285–368.
 White, Richard E. (1982). "A catalog of the Coleoptera of America north of Mexico. Family: Anobiidae". US Department of Agriculture, Agriculture Handbook, 529–570.

Anobiidae
Beetles described in 1965